Heer Oudelands Ambacht is a neighbourhood of Zwijndrecht, Netherlands.

History
Heer Oudelands Ambacht was a separate municipality between 1817 and 1857, when it merged with Kijfhoek into the existing municipality of Groote Lindt. In 1840, there were 12 houses and 84 residents in Heer Oudelands Ambacht.

Groote Lindt, containing Heer Oudelands Ambacht, merged into Zwijndrecht on 28 June 1881.

People from Heer Oudelands Ambacht
 Ron Timmers

References

Zwijndrecht, Netherlands
Former municipalities of South Holland